USS Mirna (SP-1214) was a United States Navy patrol vessel in commission from 1917 to 1918.

Mirna was built in 1911 as a private motorboat of the same name. In late July 1917, the U.S. Navy acquired her under a free lease from her owner, Joseph Snellenburg Philadelphia, Pennsylvania, for use as a section patrol vessel during World War I. She was commissioned as USS Mirna (SP-1214).

Assigned to the 4th Naval District on 17 August 1917, Mirna served on patrol duties on the Delaware River through the end of 1917.

In January 1918 Mirna was ordered returned to her owner. The Navy returned her to Snellenburg on 8 May 1918.

References
 
 Department of the Navy Naval History and Heritage Command Online Library of Selected Images: U.S. Navy Ships -- Listed by Hull Number: "SP" #s and "ID" #s -- World War I Era Patrol Vessels and other Acquired Ships and Craft numbered from SP-1200 through SP-1299
 NavSource Online: Section Patrol Craft Photo Archive: Mirna (SP 1214)

Patrol vessels of the United States Navy
World War I patrol vessels of the United States
1911 ships